During the 2006–07 season, Newcastle United participated in the Premier League, finishing 13th, and also competed in the 2006–07 UEFA Cup.

Season summary

The summer transfer window saw Roeder sign Obafemi Martins from Inter Milan and Damien Duff from Chelsea, though he failed to follow up the club's interest in signing Sol Campbell, claiming he wanted younger players, and unsuccessful attempts were made to lure strikers Dirk Kuyt and Eiður Guðjohnsen to the club. As the transfer window closed Antoine Sibierski was signed from Manchester City, and young Manchester United striker Giuseppe Rossi was signed on a four-month loan. Roeder controversially made a last-minute withdrawal from the sale of winger James Milner to Aston Villa, to the fury of Villa manager Martin O'Neill.

A poor opening run of only two wins in the opening thirteen league outings saw Newcastle in deep problems at the wrong end of the table, with the team suffering from the worst injury crisis in the club's history, forcing Roeder to recruit players from the youth academy, notably David Edgar and Matty Pattison. Fan protestations against the club's board came following a mid-November defeat against Sheffield United with the club staring relegation in the face.

The return of senior players saw the club fight back up the league, but a 5–1 FA Cup hammering at home to Championship side Birmingham City left fans and players stunned. A UEFA Cup campaign following success in the Intertoto Cup had looked like the club's form of salvation, but the team crashed out to an agonising defeat on away goals at AZ Alkmaar. Following that the team ran out of steam, and manager Glenn Roeder resigned the week before the end of the season with the team left in mid-table obscurity. Things, however, did seem to look up with new manager Sam Allardyce and wealthy new owners confirmed in the off season.

New ownership and Sam Allardyce

Billionaire businessman Mike Ashley began his quest to purchase Newcastle in the spring of 2007, successfully acquiring Sir John Hall's majority stake in the club. Chairman Freddie Shepherd remained defiant that he was not going to sell the club, and, despite a takeover being inevitable, appointed Sam Allardyce as manager following his departure from Bolton Wanderers in April. However, following Mike Ashley claiming a further majority stake hold, Shepherd was forced to sell his stake to Ashley and end his ten-year tenure as chairman.
Ashley brought in lawyer Chris Mort as chairman, Tony Jimenez as vice-chairman and Derek Llambias as managing director.

Final league table

Chronological list of events
14 June 2006: Scott Parker named as Newcastle United captain following the retirement of Alan Shearer.
23 June 2006: Damien Duff signed from Chelsea.
18 July 2006: Joe Joyce appointed new Academy Manager.
24 August 2006: Obafemi Martins signed from Inter Milan.
30 August 2006: Giuseppe Rossi signed on a four-month loan from Manchester United.
30 August 2006: Antoine Sibierski signed from Manchester City.
1 September 2006: Olivier Bernard signed after being released by Rangers earlier in the summer.
26 September 2006: Newcastle United terminate the contract of assistant manager Kevin Bond.
29 September 2006: Pavel Srníček signed after being released by Beira-Mar in the summer.
22 October 2006: Nigel Pearson appointed as assistant manager.
4 November 2006: A section of Newcastle supporters stage a protest after 1–0 defeat to Sheffield United. Many call for the resignation of chairman Freddy Shepherd and other members of the board.
14 November 2006: Paul Winsper resigns as fitness coach.
16 December 2006: Newcastle United named overall winners of the Intertoto Cup.
12 January 2007: Emre charged by The Football Association with using racially aggravated abusive and/or insulting words during the match with Everton.
30 January 2007: Oguchi Onyewu signed on a four-month loan from Standard Liège.

19 March 2007: Allegations of Emre using racially aggravated abusive and/or insulting words during the match with Everton are found not proven by the FA.
2 April 2007: Newcastle United unveil plans for a new £300 million development that would increase the capacity of the stadium to at least 60,000.
30 April 2007: Michael Owen appears in a match for Newcastle United following a 10-month absence through injury.
6 May 2007: Glenn Roeder resigns as manager.
6 May 2007: Nigel Pearson named as caretaker manager.
13 May 2007: Newcastle United's season came to an end following a 1–1 Premiership draw away to bottom-placed Watford.
15 May 2007: Sam Allardyce appointed as manager.
21 May 2007: Sam Allardyce releases six players from Newcastle United's squad, including Craig Moore, Titus Bramble and Antoine Sibierski.
23 May 2007: Businessman Mike Ashley becomes the largest shareholder in Newcastle United after buying Sir John Hall's 41.6% share for £55 million. He then launched a formal takeover bid.

Team kit
The team kit for the 2006–07 season was produced by Adidas and the main shirt sponsor was Northern Rock.

Transfers

In
{| border="0" style="width:100%;"
|-
|  style="background:#fff; text-align:left; vertical-align:top; width:100%;"|

Out
{| border="0" style="width:100%;"
|-
|  style="background:#fff; text-align:left; vertical-align:top; width:100%;"|

Players

First-team squad
All players in the Newcastle United squad during the 2006-07 season

Left club during season

Reserve squad
The following players made most of their appearances for the reserve team this season, and did not appear in a first-team squad this season.

Left club during season

Under-18 squad
The following players made most of their appearances for the under-18 team this season, but may have also appeared for the reserves.

Trialists

Match results

Friendlies

Premier League
Results by round

Intertoto Cup

UEFA Cup

League Cup

FA Cup

Player statistics

Goalscorers

Discipline

In all competitions.

Appearances and goals
All players to have appeared in the matchday squad during the 2006-07 season.

|-
! colspan=16 style=background:#dcdcdc; text-align:center| Goalkeepers

|-
! colspan=16 style=background:#dcdcdc; text-align:center| Defenders

|-
! colspan=16 style=background:#dcdcdc; text-align:center| Midfielders

|-
! colspan=16 style=background:#dcdcdc; text-align:center| Forwards

|-
! colspan=16 style=background:#dcdcdc; text-align:center| Players transferred out during the season

|-

Coaching staff

References

External links
FootballSquads - Newcastle United - 2006/07

Newcastle United F.C. seasons
Newcastle United